Steve Missillier (born 12 December 1984) is a French alpine skier and non-commissioned officer. Missillier represented France at the 2010 Winter Olympics in Vancouver, and won a silver medal in giant slalom at the 2014 Winter Olympics in Sochi.

References

External links
 

1984 births
Living people
French male alpine skiers
Olympic alpine skiers of France
Alpine skiers at the 2010 Winter Olympics
Sportspeople from Annecy
Alpine skiers at the 2014 Winter Olympics
Medalists at the 2014 Winter Olympics
Olympic silver medalists for France
Olympic medalists in alpine skiing